Arkadiusz Wrzosek (born 3 June 1992) is a Polish kickboxer. He is currently competing for Konfrontacja Sztuk Walki, having previously competed in Glory.

Wrzosek knocked out Badr Hari at Glory 78.

Kickboxing career 
He started martial arts training at the age of 19 at the Copacabana club in Warsaw under the supervision of Igor Kołacin. He fought his first amateur fights in the Sanda formula , in which he won the cup and the Polish championship. In amateur formulas he fought over 40 fights, many times winning national and international competitions. In 2014-2017, a member of the national team. In 2015, he was a contender for the WKU world champion belt  . He has been contracted with the FEN organization since 2015, and the heavyweight champion of this organization since 2017. In 2018, he signed a contract with the Fonfara Promotions group for his debut in professional boxing. In November 2018, he joined Glory, the largest organization kick-boxing in the world.

On March 16, 2019, he fought the last match for FEN . During the FEN 24 gala he defended the championship belt technically knocking out Patrick Schmid with low kicks.

At Glory 71, he replaced Demoreo Dennis 's would-be opponent . In the second round he won by technical knockout, stopping the opponent with strong low kicks.

In the next duel he faced the fight of the evening of the Glory 78 gala with a Dutchman of Moroccan origin, Badr Hari. Despite counting three times, in the second round he sensationally knocked out Hari with a high kick. The victory earned him the award for the best knockout of the year 2021.

On March 19, 2022, at Glory 80, there was a rematch between Wrzosek and Hari. The fight, planned for three rounds, did not last because of riots in the stands in which policemen and fans were injured. The gala was discontinued and the duel was deemed not to have taken place. Wrzosek was leading by 19:18 on all the judges' scorecards. The fans of Legia and ADO Den Haag supporting the Pole were quickly blamed for the brawl . According to the Wrzoska camp, the riots were provoked by the Moroccans who threw bottles and chairs at them. The fight was declared a No Contest.

MMA career 
On June 15, 2022, the Confrontation of Martial Arts (promoting fighting in MMA ) informed fans via social media about the contracting of Arkadiusz Wrzosek. Three days later, during the KSW 71 gala, the match between Tomasz Sarara and Arkadiusz Wrzosek was announced as the main event of the KSW 73 gala , which took place on August 20, 2022 in Warsaw. Wrzosek made a successful debut in the MMA formula, beating Sarara via TKO in the third round.

Wrzosek faced Tomáš Možný at KSW 79 on February 25, 2023. He won the bout via unanimous decision.

Championships and accomplishments

Kickboxing

Professional
2017 Fight Exclusive Night Heavyweight (+95 kg/209 lb) Championship (one time)
Two successful title defenses
2018 ISKA international Heavyweight (+95 kg/209 lb) Championship (one time)
2021 Glory Knockout of the Year

Amateur
2013 Polish Sanda Cup 1st place (-90 kg/198 lb)
2014 Polish Sanda Champion (-100 kg/220 lb)
2014 Polish Muay Thai IFMA Runner-up (-91 kg/200 lb)
2014 European Muay Thai IFMA Champion (-91 kg/200 lb)
2015 Polish Muay Thai IFMA Champion (+91 kg/200 lb)
2016 K-1 Global World Champion (+91 kg/200 lb)
2017 Polish Kickboxing Cup 1st place (+91 kg/200 lb)

Kickboxing record 

|-
|-  style="background:#c5d2ea;"
| 2022-03-19|| NC ||align=left| Badr Hari || Glory 80 || Hasselt, Belgium || No Contest || 2 || 3:00
|-
! style="background:white" colspan=9 |{{small|The fight was cancelled after two rounds due to safety concerns over a riot in the audience. The bout was determined a No Contest.<ref>statement on Glory 80</ref>}}
|-
|-  style="background:#cfc;"
| 2021-04-09|| Win ||align=left| Badr Hari || Glory 78: Rotterdam || Rotterdam, Netherlands || KO (Head Kick) || 2 || 1:30
|-
|-  style="background:#cfc;"
| 2019-11-22|| Win ||align=left| Demoreo Dennis || Glory 71: Chicago || Chicago, USA || TKO (Leg Kicks) || 2 || 2:59
|-
|-  style="background:#cfc;"
| 2019-03-16|| Win ||align=left| Patrick Schmid || FEN 24: All or Nothing || Warsaw, Poland || TKO (Leg Kicks) || 5 || 0:23
|-
! style="background:white" colspan=9 |
|-
|-  style="background:#fbb;"
| 2018-12-08|| Loss ||align=left| Benjamin Adegbuyi || Glory 62: Rotterdam Semi Final || Rotterdam, Netherlands || Decision (Unanimous) || 3 || 3:00
|-
|-  style="background:#cfc;"
| 2018-10-27|| Win ||align=left| Vladimir Toktasynov || Granda PRO 7 || Warsaw, Poland || TKO || 1 || 1:05
|-
! style="background:white" colspan=9 |
|-
|-  style="background:#cfc;"
| 2018-04-28|| Win ||align=left| Pawel Voronin || Granda PRO 6 || Warsaw, Poland || TKO || 1 || 1:10
|-
! style="background:white" colspan=9 |
|-
|-  style="background:#cfc;"
| 2018-03-10|| Win ||align=left| Artur Bizewski || FEN 20: Next Level || Warsaw, Poland || Decision || 5 || 3:00
|-
! style="background:white" colspan=9 |
|-
|-  style="background:#fbb;"
| 2017-11-03|| Loss ||align=left| Colin George || VIP Fight Night || Dubai, UAE || KO || 3 || 2:47
|-
|-  style="background:#cfc;"
| 2017-10-14|| Win ||align=left| Nikolai Falin || FEN 19: Battle for Wroclaw || Warsaw, Poland || KO || 1 || 1:49 
|-
! style="background:white" colspan=9 |
|-
|-  style="background:#cfc;"
| 2017-06-09|| Win ||align=left| Kai Durak || Granda PRO 4 || Warsaw, Poland || TKO || 2 || 2:41 
|-
|-  style="background:#cfc;"
| 2017-04-08|| Win ||align=left| Tomáš Klimacek || GSW Radomsko || Radomsko, Poland || KO || 1 || 2:13 
|-
|-  style="background:#cfc;"
| 2017-03-11|| Win ||align=left| Artur Bizewski || FEN 16: Warsaw Reloaded || Warsaw, Poland || Decision (unanimous) || 3 || 3:00 
|-
|-  style="background:#cfc;"
| 2016-11-01|| Win ||align=left| Alexey Buchinsky || PLMMA 70: Championships || Warsaw, Poland || KO (kicks) || 1 || 1:47
|-
|-  style="background:#cfc;"
| 2016-08-13|| Win ||align=left| Kryspin Kalski || FEN 13: Summer Edition || Gdynia, Poland || Decision (split) || 4 || 3:00
|-
|-  style="background:#fbb;"
| 2016-03-19 || Loss ||align=left| Nikolai Falin || FEN 11: Warsaw Time || Warsaw, Poland || Decision (split) || 4 || 3:00
|-
|-  style="background:#fbb;"
| 2015-10-16 || Loss ||align=left| Tomáš Možný || Boxing Night 11 || Warsaw, Poland || Decision (unanimous) || 5 || 3:00
|-
! style="background:white" colspan=9 |
|-
|-  style="background:#fbb;"
| 2015-06-28|| Loss||align=left| Artur Bizewski || WBT || Gdynia, Poland || Decision (unanimous) || 3 || 3:00 
|-
| colspan=9 | Legend:    

|-  style="background:#cfc"
| 2014-09- || Win||align=left| Florent Kaouachi || 2014 IFMA European Championships, Tournament Final || Poland || TKO (Injury) || 2 || 2:00
|-
! style=background:white colspan=9 |
|-
|-  style="background:#cfc"
| 2014-09-|| Win||align=left| Jakob Styben || 2014 IFMA European Championships, Tournament Semifinal || Poland || Decision || 3 || 3:00
|-
| colspan=9 | Legend'':

Professional Boxing record

Mixed martial arts record

|Win
|align=center|2–0
|Tomáš Možný
|Decision (unanimous)
|KSW 79: De Fries vs. Duffee
|
|align=center|3
|align=center|5:00
|Liberec, Czech Republic
|-
|Win
|align=center|1–0
|Tomasz Sarara
|TKO (punches)
|KSW 73: Wrzosek vs. Sarara
|
|align=center|3
|align=center|3:55 
|Warsaw, Poland
|

See also
List of male kickboxers

References

External links

1992 births
Living people
Polish male kickboxers
Glory kickboxers
Polish male boxers
Polish male mixed martial artists
Mixed martial artists utilizing sanshou
Mixed martial artists utilizing Muay Thai
Mixed martial artists utilizing boxing
Polish sanshou practitioners
Polish Muay Thai practitioners